Moultrie County is a county in the U.S. state of Illinois. According to the 2020 United States Census, its population was 14,526. Its county seat is Sullivan. The name is pronounced as in "mole tree", unlike the pronunciation of its namesake, the South Carolinian Revolutionary War hero William Moultrie.

History
Moultrie County was formed in 1843 with areas taken from Shelby and Macon counties. It is named for South Carolina General, and later Governor, William Moultrie. General Moultrie defended Sullivan's Island, South Carolina from British attack in 1776. The site was later renamed Fort Moultrie. Nearby Jasper County was named for Sgt. William Jasper, another hero of the defense of Sullivan's Island.

The official flag of the county is the Moultrie Flag, which was flown over the new fortress on Sullivan's Island, when Moultrie defended it, and was designed by Moultrie. It went on to become iconic of liberty in the South.

When Abraham Kellar of Lovington, John Cook of Marrowbone, and John Fleming of Nelson proposed the formation of a new county from Macon, Shelby, and Coles counties, Macon gave up a strip of “worthless swamp” that is now among the most fertile land in the world, but Shelby and Coles voters refused to give up any land. Finally, Shelby County gave up some of its land to make a zig-zag border with Moultrie County.

Geography

Climate and weather

Major highways

  U.S. Route 36
  Illinois Route 16
  Illinois Route 32
  Illinois Route 121
  Illinois Route 133

Adjacent counties

 Piatt County - north
 Douglas County - east
 Coles County - southeast
 Shelby County - south
 Macon County - northwest

Demographics

As of the 2010 United States Census, there were 14,846 people, 5,758 households, and 4,053 families living in the county. The racial makeup of the county was 98.5% white, 0.3% black or African American, 0.2% Asian, 0.2% American Indian, 0.2% from other races, and 0.6% from two or more races. Those of Hispanic or Latino origin made up 0.9% of the population. In terms of ancestry, 23.8% were German, 12.0% were Irish, 11.4% were American, and 10.9% were English.

Of the 5,758 households, 31.8% had children under the age of 18 living with them, 57.6% were married couples living together, 8.9% had a female householder with no husband present, 29.6% were non-families, and 25.5% of all households were made up of individuals. The average household size was 2.51 and the average family size was 3.01. The median age was 40.3 years.

The median income for a household in the county was $46,364 and the median income for a family was $54,494. Males had a median income of $42,581 versus $26,799 for females. The per capita income for the county was $22,954. About 6.2% of families and 11.0% of the population were below the poverty line, including 17.2% of those under age 18 and 6.7% of those age 65 or over.

Communities

City
 Sullivan (seat)

Villages

 Allenville
 Arthur (partial)
 Bethany
 Dalton City
 Gays
 Lovington

Unincorporated Communities

 Bruce
 Dunn
 Fuller
 Kirksville
 Lake City

Townships

 Dora
 East Nelson
 Jonathan Creek
 Lovington
 Lowe
 Marrowbone
 Sullivan
 Whitley

Education
Moultrie County is served by three school districts.
 Sullivan Community Unit School District 300
 Okaw Valley Community Unit School District 302
 Arthur-Lovington/Atwood-Hammond Community Unit School District 305

Politics
Moultrie County voters have voted for the Republican Party candidate in eight of the last ten national election campaigns.

See also
 National Register of Historic Places listings in Moultrie County

References

 
Illinois counties
1843 establishments in Illinois
Populated places established in 1843